The rivière de l'Ours, also known as Bear River, is a tributary of the Gulf of St. Lawrence, flowing in the municipality of L'Île-d'Anticosti, in the Minganie Regional County Municipality, in the administrative region of Côte-Nord, in the province of Quebec, in Canada.

A forest road serves the upper and intermediate part of its course. Forestry is the main economic activity in this area; recreational tourism, second.

Geography 
The Bear River takes its source from a very small lake located in the center of Anticosti Island. This source is located at:
  north-east of the town center of the village of Port-Menier;
  west of the eastern point of Anticosti Island.

  north-east, to a stream (coming from the west);
  north-east, to its mouth.

The Bear River flows into the bottom of Bear Bay on the north shore of Anticosti Island.

Toponymy 
The toponym "Rivière de l'Ours" was formalized on September 12, 1974, at the Place Names Bank of the Commission de toponymie du Québec.

See also 

 List of rivers of Quebec

References 

Rivers of Côte-Nord
Anticosti Island
Minganie Regional County Municipality